Mark Fränk (born 21 June 1977 in Neustrelitz) is a retired German track and field athlete who competed in the javelin throw. His personal best throw is 84.88 m, achieved in 2005.

Achievements

Seasonal bests by year
1999 - 77.62
2001 - 78.54
2002 - 83.24
2003 - 80.55
2004 - 81.21
2005 - 84.88
2006 - 81.98
2007 - 82.23
2009 - 83.86
2010 - 80.46
2011 - 82.54
2012 - 81.50

External links
 

1977 births
Living people
People from Neustrelitz
People from Bezirk Neubrandenburg
German male javelin throwers
Sportspeople from Mecklenburg-Western Pomerania
German national athletics champions